Laura Bartlett (born 22 June 1988) is a retired Scottish field hockey player, representing Britain at the 2012 Summer Olympics. She competed for the national team in the women's tournament, winning a bronze medal.

Bartlett announced her retirement in February 2013, having been capped fifty-seven times for Scotland and fifty for Great Britain. The former Milne Craig Clydesdale Western player represented Great Britain at the Summer Olympics in 2004, 2008 and 2012. Bartlett last represented Scotland in 2011, the year in which she was awarded BOA Athlete of the Year.

References

External links
 
 

1988 births
Living people
British female field hockey players
Scottish female field hockey players
Field hockey players at the 2008 Summer Olympics
Field hockey players at the 2012 Summer Olympics
Olympic field hockey players of Great Britain
Olympic medalists in field hockey
Olympic bronze medallists for Great Britain
People educated at the Glasgow Academy
Medalists at the 2012 Summer Olympics
Scottish Olympic medallists